The following is a list of ecoregions in Greece as identified by the World Wide Fund for Nature (WWF).

Terrestrial
Greece is in the Palearctic realm. Ecoregions are listed by biome.

Temperate broadleaf and mixed forests
Balkan mixed forests
Rodope montane mixed forests

Mediterranean forests, woodlands, and shrub
Illyrian deciduous forests
Pindus Mountains mixed forests
Aegean and Western Turkey sclerophyllous and mixed forests
Crete Mediterranean forests

Freshwater
 Aegean drainages
 Ionian drainages
 Southeast Adriatic drainages
 Thrace
 Vardar
 Western Anatolia

Marine
Greece's seas are in the Mediterranean Sea marine province of the Temperate Northern Atlantic marine realm.
 Aegean Sea
 Ionian Sea

 
Flora of Greece
ecoregions
Greece